Braulio de Oliveira Estima is a 4th degree black belt in Brazilian jiu-jitsu. He received his black belt from Carlos Gracie Jr. on January 4, 2004. Throughout his grappling career, he has won in many Brazilian Jiu-Jitsu tournaments across the world, such as the Mundials, ADCC, Pan American Championship, and European Championship. His long list of accomplishments has made him well respected among other Brazilian Jiu-Jitsu practitioners, such that some consider him one of the top Brazilian Jiu-Jitsu practitioners in the world and one of the head coaches for Gracie Barra U.K.

Early life and education
Braulio Estima was born on June 10, 1980 in Recife, Brazil. He was first exposed to martial arts at the young age of 9, where he was introduced to Judo. However, a year later, his judo instructor suffered an untimely death, which caused Estima to take a break from martial arts. Six years later, he decided to come back and began training Judo and Brazilian jiu-jitsu at the Gracie Barra Jiu-Jitsu Academy.

Estima was first under thetutelage of Charles Dos Anjos when he first began training Brazilian jiu-jitsu at Gracie Barra. In less than one year of training, he captured 5 major junior titles in the white belt division, and as a result, was promoted to blue belt.  When Dos Anjos left the academy, Ze Radiola took over as Estima's mentor and teacher. In 1999, after 3 years of training, Estima won his first Pan-American Championship as a blue belt. He was then promoted to purple belt soon after. Following more successful tournament showings, such as the bronze medal at the Pan-American Championship in 2000, he was promoted to brown belt. He went on to win gold for three straight years (2001-2003) in the Pan-American Championship as a brown belt.

Career
At the end of 2002, Maurição Gomes invited Estima to teach at the Gracie Barra Academy in Birmingham, England to replace him. Estima accepted Maurição's offer and made Birmingham his permanent home. He continues to teach there to this day with the help of his brother Victor Estima and Otavio Souza.  Since then, Estima has taught several respected UK grapplers such as Graham Keys, Kenny Baker, Tom Barlow, Chris Rees and Luke Costello.

On January 4, 2004, Estima received his black belt from Carlos Gracie Jr. Five months after this, Estima won the Mundials in the 85 kg weight division. This victory made him well respected among other Brazilian jiu-jitsu practitioners because he was only a black belt for 5 months when he won the tournament. Two years later, Estima went on to win the 2006 Mundials and Pan American Championship and eventually captured all the major titles when he won the European Championship, Mundials, and ADCC in 2009. After the 2014 IBJJF World Championship Estima tested positive for DMAA, a banned Performance Enhancing Drugs, Estima was stripped of his 2014 World title by IBJJF and USADA and suspended for two years.

Mixed martial arts
Estima began training in  mixed martial arts, and MMA organization Shine Fights signed him to a multi-fight deal. He was scheduled to debut against Rick Hawn on Shine Fights: Worlds Collide in May 2010, but the entire card was scrapped following the loss of the card's headliner, Mayorga vs. Thomas. Estima rescheduled his MMA debut,  signing with Titan Fighting Championships. In 2012, Estima signed with Authentic Sports Management and  trained with MMA fighters such as Rashad Evans, Jorge Santiago, and Eddie Alvarez.

Braulio Estima and Nick Diaz's feud
Estima was scheduled to face Nick Diaz in a No-Gi Brazilian jiu-jitsu superfight at the 2012 World Jiu-Jitsu Expo. It was expected to take place on May 12, 2012 in Long Beach, California.  However, Nick Diaz did not show up to the fight leaving Estima waited on the mat, later Diaz claimed that Estima did not make weight even though Estima weigh in on competition day at the required  weight limit. Estima refused to fight a late replacement and offered instead to fight Diaz in a mixed martial arts bout.

After UFC 158, Estima, who was a training partner for Georges St-Pierre, went backstage to go shake Diaz's hand. Nick responded by shoving him and calling him names. According to Estima, Kron Gracie was antagonizing him along with Diaz.

Records 
Estima made history when he submitted seven people in a total of 5 minutes and 24 seconds at the 2003 Pan-American Championship.

Estima currently holds the most wins at the European Championship, with a total number of 5.

Estima was also part of the inaugural class of the ADCC Hall of Fame, inducted in 2021.

Nickname
His nickname, Carcará, comes from a name of a bird around his hometown in northeast Brazil. In addition, he also used to wear a gi brand called Carcará, which has been discontinued.

Mixed martial arts record

|-
| Win
|align=center|1–0
| Chris Holland
| Technical Submission (arm triangle choke)
| Titan Fighting Championships 24
| 
|align=center|1
|align=center|3:21
|Kansas City, Kansas, United States
|MMA debut

Grappling results

 World Professional Jiu-Jitsu Cup 2010 (2nd place in Absolute and -83 kg divisions)
 World Professional Jiu-Jitsu Cup 2009 (2nd place in Absolute and 4th place in -95 kg divisions)
 2011 ADCC Submission Wrestling World Championship - Superfight Champion
 2009 ADCC Submission Wrestling World Championship - 88 kg and Absolute Champion
 Absolute World Cup Champion - 2006
 Absolute World Champion - 2002
 World Champion - 2004, 2006, 2009
 World Champion - 2014 (disqualified)
 Grand Slam Capital Challenge Jordan  - 2008 heavy weight and Absolute Champion
 Pan American Champion - 1999, 2001, 2002, 2003, 2006
 Absolute Pan American Champion - 2003
 Pan American No Gi Champion - 2008
 Absolute Pan American No Gi Champion - 2008
 European Champion - 2007, 2009, 2011
 Absolute European Champion - 2007, 2009
 Champion of the International Team - 2003, 2007
 Champion's Challenge BRAZIL X USA - 2003
 ADCC Silver Medalist - 2007
 World Silver Medalist - 2008
 3rd placed on the World Championship - 2003
 3rd placed on the World Championship - 2001
 1st place on the World Championship-2001

See also
List of Brazilian Jiu-Jitsu practitioners

References

External links
 Confederation of Brazilian Jiu-Jitsu Results
 Braulio Estima BJJ (GI) career on  Martial Arts Ranking

1979 births
Living people
Brazilian male mixed martial artists
Mixed martial artists utilizing Brazilian jiu-jitsu
Brazilian practitioners of Brazilian jiu-jitsu
Brazilian jiu-jitsu trainers
Brazilian submission wrestlers
Pan American Games competitors for Brazil
People awarded a black belt in Brazilian jiu-jitsu
Sportspeople from Recife
Doping cases in Brazilian jiu-jitsu
ADCC Hall of Fame inductees